is a Japanese footballer currently playing as a forward for YSCC Yokohama.

Career statistics

Club
.

Notes

References

1996 births
Living people
Association football people from Ōita Prefecture
Meiji University alumni
Japanese footballers
Japanese expatriate footballers
Association football forwards
J3 League players
YSCC Yokohama players
Japanese expatriate sportspeople in Germany
Expatriate footballers in Germany